Gaurav Puri (born 28 July 1991) is an Indian cricketer. He made his List A debut on 10 October 2019, for Chandigarh in the 2019–20 Vijay Hazare Trophy. He made his Twenty20 debut on 8 November 2019, for Chandigarh in the 2019–20 Syed Mushtaq Ali Trophy. He made his first-class debut on 17 February 2022, for Chandigarh in the 2021–22 Ranji Trophy.

References

External links
 

1991 births
Living people
Indian cricketers
Chandigarh cricketers
Place of birth missing (living people)